The 26th Special Tactics Squadron is one of the Special Tactics units of the United States Air Force Special Operations Command (AFSOC). It is garrisoned at Cannon Air Force Base, New Mexico.  From 1991 to 1992, the squadron's predecessor, the 7026th Special Activities Squadron was stationed in Europe.

Overview
The Squadron is made up of Special Tactics Officers, Combat Controllers, Combat Rescue Officers, Pararescuemen, Special Operations Weather Technicians, Air Liaison Officers, Tactical Air Control Party operators, and a number of combat support airmen which comprise 58 Air Force specialties.

Special Tactics Squadrons are organized, trained and equipped specifically for various special operations missions facilitating air operations on the battlefield. They conduct combat search and rescue missions, collect intelligence, as well as call in close air support or airstrikes against enemy combatants and are often partnered with other U.S. special operations forces overseas.

The squadron absorbed the personnel and equipment of Detachment 1, 720th Special Tactics Group when it was activated in 2014.

Lineage
 Designated and activated as the 7026 Special Activities Squadron on 1 Aug 1991 and inactivated on 1 May 1992
 Redesignated as the 26th Special Tactics Squadron
 Activated on 28 February 2014

Assignments
 Unknown: 1 August 1991 - 1 May 1992
 720th Special Tactics Group, 28 Feb 2014–Present

Stations
Cannon Air Force Base 28 February 2014 – Present

References

026
Military units and formations in New Mexico